Freer House is a historic home located at Poughkeepsie, Dutchess County, New York.  It was built about 1728 and is a -story, four-bay-wide frame farmers cottage built of coursed fieldstone.  It is the oldest extant structure in the City of Poughkeepsie.

It was added to the National Register of Historic Places in 1982.

References

Houses on the National Register of Historic Places in New York (state)
Houses in Poughkeepsie, New York
National Register of Historic Places in Poughkeepsie, New York